Aisha Chaudhary (27 March 1996  24 January 2015) was an Indian author and motivational speaker. She is the author of the book My Little Epiphanies, published one day before her death. The 2019 Hindi film The Sky Is Pink is based on her life.

Early life
Aisha was the daughter of Niren Chaudhary, the president of South Asia operations of Yum! Brands and Aditi, a mental healthcare worker. She has an elder brother named Ishan Chaudhary and an elder sister Tanya Chaudhary, who died at seven months old. Aisha was born with severe combined immunodeficiency (SCID). When she was six months old, she had to undergo a bone marrow transplant. As a side effect of the medical therapy following chemotherapy, she developed a serious illness called pulmonary fibrosis – a type of condition that causes irreversible scarring of the lungs.

Career

Chaudhary gave inspirational talks from age 15 to the time of her death. She was named an INK Fellow and spoke in the 2011 and 2013 INK Conferences. Chaudhary was also a speaker at TEDxPune in 2013. 

She wrote a book that was published one day before her death.

Representation in other media
The Sky Is Pink, a film based on her life, directed by Shonali Bose and starring Priyanka Chopra as Aditi Chaudhary, Farhan Akhtar as Niren Chaudhary, Zaira Wasim as the main Aisha Chaudhary and Rohit Suresh Saraf as Ishan Chaudhary was released theatrically on 11 October 2019.

The documentary Black Sunshine Baby is about her life.

Works 
My Little Epiphanies (2015) which included her thoughts about life and also wanted people to know about her journey that could help others going through such hardships in life.

References 

Women writers from Delhi
Indian motivational speakers
Women motivational speakers
Articles created or expanded during Women's History Month (India) - 2015
1996 births
2015 deaths